The Advanced Graphics Riser is a variation of the Accelerated Graphics Port (AGP) used in some PCIe motherboards made by MSI to offer a limited backwards compatibility with AGP. It is, effectively, a modified PCIe slot allowing for performance comparable to an AGP 4x/8x slot, but with limited support of AGP cards. The manufacturer has published a non-exhaustive compatibility list of cards and chipsets that work with the modified slot.

References

Motherboard expansion slot